The Australian Greens frontbench consists of all Greens members of Parliament serving as the party's spokespeople inside Parliament on various issues, each member being assigned portfolios for their speaking duties. This allows the Greens to shadow government policies and actions from the party perspective.

List

References

External links
  of Green MPs and Senators

Di Natale
2015 establishments in Australia
2020 disestablishments in Australia